God Semenovich Nisanov (born 24 April 1972) is a Russian-Azerbaijani billionaire property developer who is the chairman of , the largest Russian commercial estate holding.

In 2021, Proekt, an independent Russian investigative reporting outlet, reported on Nisanov's friendship with Sergey Naryshkin, the head of Russia’s Foreign Intelligence Service (SVR). Shortly thereafter, the Russian government blacklisted Proekt.

In 2022, Nisanov was sanctioned by the USA for being close to Putin and Russian officials.

Early life and education 
God Nisanov was born on 24 April 1972 in the Mountain Jewish settlement of Gyrmyzy Gasaba in Azerbaijan. His father is Semon Davidovich Nisanov, director of a canned food factory, and his mother is Margarita Mordekhayevna Nisanova (née Abramova).

He graduated first from the College of Finance and Credit and then from the Baku Law Institute.

Career 
He received his first administrative experiences as a manager at his father's factory. Later on he was engaged in oil product transportation and sales, and finally took up wholesale trade in 1992 with his friend and compatriot Zarakh Iliev.

In 2014, President Putin awarded Nisanov the Order of Friendship "for his great contribution to economic project implementation and investment fund raising for Russian Federation economy". One year after Putin's initial decree he was decorated with a memorial medal “70th Anniversary of Victory in the Great Patriotic War of 1941–1945“.

Nisanov and Moscow Mayor Sergey Sobyanin inaugurated Food City, the country's first agrocluster and the biggest wholesale and retail food store with an area of 85 hectares, in autumn of 2014. Nisanov is a co-investor in the project.

Nisanov and Sobyanin inaugurated the new international bus terminal South Gates, at the 19th kilometer of the Moscow Circular Highway, in spring of 2015. Nisanov is a co-investor. Moskvarium, Moscow's ocean life aquarium at VDNKh expo area, co-owned and developed by Nisanov, was presented to Putin and Sobyanin in August 2015.
As of 2015, Nisanov's key assets are concentrated in commercial property.

He co-owns the Amateur Gardener market, Grand furniture market, Ukraina, Radisson SАS Slavyanskaya, Moscow City international business center. To support domestic agriculture producers Kievskaya Square group of companies, chaired by Nisanov, developed Moscow's first major agro product cluster Food City. The cluster meets 33% of the capital's demand for food.

Philanthropy and public activities

In 2013, the President of Russia awarded Nisanov the Certificate of Honor for his assistance in rebuilding the Kronstadt Naval Cathedral. Nisanov has donated to schools and projects through the World Jewish Congress, of which he was elected vice-president in 2014. As part of that role, he serves as the director of the Association of Mountain Jews. In 2015, Nisanov assisted with the construction of the Cheder Menachem Jewish school in Moscow. 
In 2015, the Federation of Jewish Communities of Russia awarded Nisanov the Fiddler on the Roof award for his charity work. In 2019, Nisanov and his business partner Iliev funded and opened the Association of Mountain Jews Community Center in Moscow, to help preserve the unique cultural and historical traditions of the small community of Mountain Jews in Azerbaijan. Nisanov and Iliev initiated and sponsored the construction of the world's first museum dedicated to Mountain Jews, located in the village of Krasnaya Sloboda, which opened in 2020. Nisanov financed the construction of a sports complex at St. Petersburg State Marine Technical University (SPbGMTU).

In 2019, at a charity event celebrating the Jewish New Year, Nisanov presented World Jewish Congress President Ronald Lauder with the Global Influence Award.

Personal life 
Nisanov is married, with four children, and lives in Moscow. As of October 2022, his net worth is US$3.7 billion. Nisanov is an amateur diver and horse-breeder. He speaks six foreign languages, including Arabic, Turkish and Persian.

In 2020, he applied for Portuguese citizenship.

Awards 
 RF President Certificate of Merit (for St Nicholas Kronstadt Marine Cathedral restoration in 2012)
 Order of Friendship (for his contribution to economic project implementation and investment fund raising for Russian Federation economy in 2014)
 Leadership Award (2014)
 Russian Jewish Communities award “Fiddler on the Roof” (2015 год)
 Memorial medal “70th Anniversary of Victory in the Great Patriotic War of  1941–1945“ (for active participation in the citizen patriotic education and Great Patriotic War veterans socio-economic support, 2015)
Orders of Merit 3rd Class for service to the Fatherland Order (Azerbaijani: Vətənə xidmətə görə) (for merits in development of Azerbaijani diaspora in Russia, 2016).

References

Russian hoteliers
Russian billionaires
Azerbaijani billionaires
Russian philanthropists
Jewish philanthropists
Russian Jews
Azerbaijani Jews
Mountain Jews
Businesspeople from Moscow
People from Quba
1972 births
Living people
Recipients of the Tereggi Medal
Sanctioned due to Russo-Ukrainian War